Griesheim-près-Molsheim (literally Griesheim near Molsheim) is a commune in the Bas-Rhin department in Grand Est in north-eastern France.

Geography
Griesheim lies some five kilometres (three miles) to the south-east of Molsheim.

The village is well connected, just eight kilometres (five miles) south-west of Strasbourg airport, with the centre of Strasbourg some eighteen kilometres (eleven miles) away.   Griesheim is a couple of kilometres from the recently extended A35 autoroute on one side and the A352 autoroute on the other, although delays exacerbated by traffic congestion are a frequent feature of the roads in the Molsheim and Strasbourg areas.   For rail travellers, the nearest station is in the neighbouring village of Rosheim.

About seven miles (four kilometres) to the west, the Upper Rhine plain gives way to the lower wooded slopes of the Vosges Mountains.   To the east the land becomes progressively flatter and the agricultural potential of the alluvial soil richer between the village and the River Rhine.

Griesheim-près-Molsheim shoul not be confused with Griesheim-sur-Souffel, a village on the northern edge of Strasbourg. The two Griesheims are less than twenty kilometres (twelve miles) apart.

Adjacent communes
 Bischoffsheim
 Rosheim
 Altorf
 Innenheim
 Dorlisheim

See also
 Communes of the Bas-Rhin department

References

Communes of Bas-Rhin
Bas-Rhin communes articles needing translation from French Wikipedia